No. 41 Squadron of the Royal Air Force is the RAF's Typhoon Test and Evaluation Squadron ("TES"), based at RAF Coningsby, Lincolnshire. Its official title is "41 TES". The squadron was formed in 1916 during First World War as part of the Royal Flying Corps and served on the Western Front as a ground attack and fighter squadron. Disbanded in 1919 as part of the post-war draw down, No. 41 Squadron was re-formed as an RAF squadron in 1923 and remained on home service until 1935 when it was deployed to Aden during the Abyssinian crisis.

During the Second World War, the squadron flew Supermarine Spitfire fighters and saw action over Dunkirk and the during the Battle of Britain in the early years of the war. Combat operations were flown from Britain over German-occupied Europe during 1941–1944, before the squadron moved to the continent after the Normandy landings. During 1944–45, the squadron supported the Allied advance into Germany and it remained there until mid-1946 as part of the occupation force following the end of hostilities. In the post war years, the squadron was disbanded and re-formed several times, operating a variety of jet aircraft in the fighter, reconnaissance and interceptor roles. In 2006, the squadron was re-roled as the Fast Jet & Weapons Operational Evaluation Unit. It remained in this role until 2010 when it became the RAF's Test and Evaluation Squadron.

History

First World War, 1916–1919
No. 41 Squadron Royal Flying Corps was originally formed at Fort Rowner, RAF Gosport, in mid April 1916 with a nucleus of men from 28 Squadron RFC. However, on 22 May 1916, the squadron was disbanded again when it was re-numbered "27 Reserve Squadron RFC".

41 Squadron was re-formed on 14 July 1916 with a nucleus of men from 27 Reserve Squadron, and equipped with the Vickers F.B.5 'Gun Bus' and Airco D.H.2 'Scout'. These were replaced in early September 1916 with the Royal Aircraft Factory F.E.8, and it was these aircraft which the squadron took on their deployment to France on 15 October 1916. Eighteen aircraft departed Gosport for the 225-mile flight to St. Omer, but only 12 actually made it, the others landing elsewhere with technical problems. The 12 pilots spent a week at St. Omer before moving to Abeele, where the ground crews reached them by road, and the remaining six pilots by rail, minus their aircraft.

The F.E.8 was already obsolete as a pure fighter, and No. 41 used theirs mainly for ground attack. On 24 January 1917, the squadron claimed its first victories. These fell to Sgt Plt Cecil Tooms, who himself was killed in action only four hours later. While equipped with F.E.8s, the squadron participated in the Battle of Arras (April–May 1917) and the Battle of Messines (June 1917). By this time the unit had become the last "pusher" fighter squadron in the RFC. In July 1917 No. 41 were re-equipped with DH 5 fighters, which proved disappointing; in October 1917  the squadron finally received S.E.5a fighters, with which they were equipped for the duration of the war.

The squadron provided distinguished service in the Battle of Cambrai (November 1917), and subsequently in the German spring offensive (March 1918), and the Battle of Amiens (August 1918). 41 Squadron claimed its final victory of the war two days prior to the cessation of hostilities. In the aftermath, the unit was reduced to a cadre of just 16 men on 7 February 1919 and returned to the United Kingdom. Their new base was Tangmere, but they were moved to Croydon, Surrey, in early October and formally disbanded on 31 December 1919.

During the war, some seventeen aces served with No. 41 Squadron, including; William Gordon Claxton, Frederick McCall, William Ernest Shields, Eric John Stephens, Frank Soden, Russell Winnicott, Geoffrey Hilton Bowman, Roy W. Chappell, Alfred Hemming, Frank Harold Taylor, Malcolm MacLeod, Loudoun MacLean, future Air Vice-Marshal Meredith Thomas, and William Gillespie. The unit had a remarkable number of Canadian aces in it—ten out of the seventeen. The squadron's pilots and ground crews were awarded four DSOs, six MCs, nine DFCs, two MMs and four Mentions in Dispatches for their World War I service with the unit. The pilots were credited with destroying 111 aircraft and 14 balloons, sending down 112 aircraft out of control, and driving down 25 aircraft and five balloons. Thirty-nine men were killed or died on active service, 48 were wounded or injured, and 20 pilots became Prisoners of War including Australian Captain Norman Bruce Hair.

Between the wars, 1923–1939

The squadron reformed at RAF Northolt on 1 April 1923, equipped with the Sopwith Snipe. In 1924, it began receiving the first Armstrong Whitworth Siskin III biplanes. On 27 July 1929, eleven aircraft from 41 Squadron flew to Calais to rendezvous with French aviation pioneer Louis Blériot and escort him back to Dover in a re-enactment of the first crossing of the English Channel 20 years earlier. On 9 October 1930, Following the R101 Airship disaster in Beauvais, France, 41 Squadron pilots and ground crew formed a part of the Guard of Honour for the Lying-in-State of the 48 victims in the Palace of Westminster. Amongst the dead were the Secretary of State for Air, Brig. Gen. Lord Christopher Thomson PC CBE DSO, and the Director of Civil Aviation, Air Vice-Marshal Sir Sefton Brancker KCB AFC. Thousands filed past to pay their last respects.

During the 1930s, displays, sports, competitions, tactical exercises and flying practice were a part of regular activity. In the summer of 1934, 41 Squadron even performed a flying display for South Bucks Mothers' Union. On 1 July 1935, 41 Squadron escorted an Imperial Airways aircraft to Brussels, with the Duke and Duchess of York on board, where they attend functions for British Week at the International Exhibition. During this period, 41 Squadron was also visited by a number of British and foreign government and military dignitaries. One of the first was Japanese General Matsui Iwane who, after World War II, was held accountable and executed for the 1937 'Rape of Nanjing', in which his armies murdered an estimated 300,000 Chinese civilians. British dignitaries included Prime Minister, Ramsay MacDonald, the Chief of Air Services, Marshal of the Royal Air Force Hugh Trenchard GCB DSO, the Air Officer Commanding in Chief Air Defence of Great Britain, Air Marshal Sir Edward Ellington KCB CMG CBE, and the Air Officer Commanding Fighting Area, Air Defence of Great Britain, Air Vice-Marshal Hugh Dowding, CB CMG.

In October 1935, the squadron was sent to the Aden Protectorate, to help provide a presence in the region during the Abyssinian crisis of 1935–36, and returned to the United Kingdom in August 1936. They were then based at RAF Catterick, Yorkshire, from September 1936, where they remained until May 1940.

In April 1937, 41 Squadron's badge and motto, "Seek and Destroy", are unveiled for the first time and presented to the squadron by the AOC in C, Air Chief Marshal Sir Hugh Dowding KCB CMG. The badge takes the form of a red double-armed cross on a white background, adapted from the arms of the French town of St. Omer, the location of the squadron's first operational overseas posting, in October 1916.

On 30 December 1938, 41 Squadron was issued with the Supermarine Spitfire, becoming the third RAF squadron to receive them. By early February 1939, the squadron had received a full complement of 20 Mark I Spitfires, at the cost of £129,130.

Around 200 pilots served with 41 Squadron between 1 April 1923 and 2 September 1939. During this period, no battle honours were granted, nor any decorations awarded, but the era produced ten Air Commodores, nine Air Vice-Marshals, two Air Marshals and two Air Chief Marshals. During these same years, eleven men were killed and three injured in flying accidents, and three injured in aircrew accidents on the ground.

Second World War, 1939–1945

Following the declaration of war on 3 September 1939, 41 Squadron spent the first several months on monotonous routine patrols in the north of England. At the end of May 1940, the squadron flew south to RAF Hornchurch to participate in the evacuation of Dunkirk. Twelve days later, they returned to RAF Catterick, claiming six Axis aircraft destroyed and one probable, but also left behind two pilots, the squadron's first pilot killed in action and their first lost as a prisoner of war. After resting for a few weeks, the squadron headed south again on 26 July 1940, to participate in the first phase of the Battle of Britain. In its two-week tour, the Squadron claimed 10 Axis aircraft destroyed, four probables and three damaged, for the loss of one pilot killed and a second wounded.

Again, 41 Squadron returned north to Catterick for a few weeks rest, but returned to Hornchurch on 3 September 1940, where they remained until the end of February 1941. They were now in the thick of the Battle of Britain. The price was high, but so was the damage they inflicted on the Luftwaffe. On 5 September, the squadron experienced one of its blackest days. The Commanding Officer and OC, B Flight, were killed in action and three other pilots were shot down and two were wounded in action; one of these was hospitalised for six months.

On 31 October 1940, the Battle of Britain was considered officially over. 49 pilots flew with the squadron between 10 July and 31 October 1940. Of these, 42 were British, 2 Canadian, 2 Irish and 2 New Zealanders. 10 were killed and 12 wounded in action (44% casualties). The squadron claimed over 100 victories from July 1940 to the end of that year.

On 23 February 1941, the squadron returned to Catterick for a well-earned break. Only four pilots remained from the original 18 who landed in Hornchurch on 3 September 1940. However, in reality it is much worse: 16 pilots had been killed, five wounded and hospitalised (who did not return) and 15 otherwise posted away, in effect a 200% turnover since the unit's deployment to Hornchurch in early September. The squadron also now has its third Commanding Officer since then, and its fourth within ten months.

Following five months rest in Catterick, during which the last Battle of Britain hardened pilots departed and new recruits joined from the British Commonwealth Air Training Program, the squadron headed south to Merston, Sussex, on 28 July 1941, to join the Tangmere Wing, where the wing leader was Douglas Bader. There followed an intensive period of offensive activity over France.

On 12 February 1942, 41 Squadron took part in the attack on the German Kriegsmarine's ,  and  after they escaped from Brest and made a dash up the Channel to the safety of their home ports. During these actions, 41 Squadron claimed three German aircraft destroyed and one damaged, but lost one pilot who failed to return.

The squadron also supported the ill-fated Canadian landings at Dieppe (Operation Jubilee) on 19 August 1942, completing three squadron-strength missions over the beaches. The pilots returned from the third without the Officer Commanding, Sqn Ldr Geoffrey Hyde, who was hit by Flak and killed; he was the squadron's only casualty that day.

Tired, after a busy summer on the south coast fending off Me109s and FW190s fulfilling the Luftwaffe's "hit and run" strategy, the squadron was taken off operations until February 1943 and sent to Llanbedr, Wales, for an extended period of rest. This heralded the start of an intensive period of turnover in the unit's ranks as men were rested and fresh pilots brought in.

In February 1943, the unit became the first of only two squadrons to receive the new Griffon-engine Spitfire Mark XII. Having rested, re-equipped and trained on the new aircraft, the squadron was sent back onto operations in April 1943, and claimed their first definitive victory in over ten months on 17 April. This was also the first by the RAF in the Mk. XII Spitfire.

From late June 1943, large scale bomber escorts to targets in France, Belgium and the Netherlands became a daily event and Ramrod escorts to formations of between 50 and 150 B-17 Flying Fortresses and B-26 Marauders became routine.

41 Squadron provided air support in the lead-up to, and throughout the D-Day landings. On D-Day itself, 6 June 1944, three pilots were hit by Flak over the bridgehead and one was killed. On 19 June, however, the squadron was pulled off air support for the bridgehead in France and was deployed solely in the destruction of Germany's newest weapon, the V-1 flying bomb. On 28 August 1944, the squadron claimed its last of 53 V1s destroyed during the war. Several pilots succeeded in bringing them down after expending all their ammunition, by flying alongside them and placing their own wingtips underneath that of the V1. The wind movement between both wingtips was sufficient to upset the V1's gyroscope and send crashing it to the ground.

The squadron was re-equipped with the Spitfire XIV in September 1944 and during the ensuing three months participated in 'Big Ben' operations against V2 launch sites, in Operation Market Garden at Arnhem and Nijmegen, in operations in the Walcheren campaign, and in the Allied Oil Campaign over Germany.

The squadron moved to the continent in early December 1944, making its base at Diest in Belgium. Ground targets were the squadron's chief prey as a member of 125 Wing, and the unit attacked anything moving on road, rail or canal in Germany. Operating so close to the ground, Flak also took its toll on pilots and aircraft. One pilot was killed, three wounded and two shot down and taken prisoner.

In April 1945, the squadron moved forward with the advancing front and made its first base in Germany, just southwest of the town of Celle, 140 miles (225 km) due west of Berlin, and only a short distance southeast of the Bergen-Belsen concentration camp. During April and early May 1945, German resistance crumbled. 41 Squadron claimed 33 enemy aircraft destroyed, two probably destroyed and three damaged in the air and 21 damaged on the ground, in the 23 days preceding 3 May 1945 (the date of the squadron's final claim). Their own casualties for the same period were no pilots killed or wounded in action, and no aircraft lost to enemy action, although some did sustain combat damage.

After the cessation of hostilities, the squadron was based a short time at Kastrup (Copenhagen) but then returned to Germany, where it became a part of the Allied occupying forces, 'BAFO'. By the end of the war, 41 Squadron had claimed 200 aircraft destroyed, 61 probably destroyed, 109 damaged and 53 V-1s destroyed. On 31 March 1946, still based on the Continent, 41 Squadron was disbanded by re-numbering to 26 Squadron.

The squadron had two mascots during the war: 'Wimpy', a Bull Terrier with the tip of one ear missing, at Catterick in 1939–40, and 'Perkin', a large black French Poodle, in 1943–44. The squadron's 325 World War II pilots were men from Britain, Australia, Austria, Belgium, Canada, Czechoslovakia, France, the Republic of Ireland, the Netherlands, New Zealand, Norway, Palestine, Poland, White Russia, Rhodesia, South Africa, Trinidad, Uruguay, the United States, and Zululand.

41 Squadron's pilots were awarded three DSOs, 21 DFCs, one DFM and one Mention in Dispatches for their World War II service with the unit. Sixty four were killed in action or died on active service, 58 were wounded in action or injured in accidents, three were shot down but evaded capture and returned to the United Kingdom, and 21 pilots were shot down and became Prisoners of War. The average age of a man who died in service with 41 Squadron during World War II was 23½.

Post War, 1946–2006

On 1 April 1946, only a day after being disbanded in Germany, 41 Squadron was re-formed at RAF Dalcross in Scotland as a fighter squadron, by re-numbering from 122 Squadron, and reverted to the Supermarine Spitfire, this time the Mk. F.21.

The squadron flew its Spitfires for the last time on 18 August 1947, and became No. 41 Instrument Flying Rating Squadron, equipped with the Airspeed Oxfords & North American Harvard. However, in June the following year, the squadron reverted to fighter defence and was re-equipped with the De Havilland Hornet F.1, followed later by the F.3.

41 Squadron became a day fighter unit again in January 1951 and entered the jet age, receiving its first jet-powered aircraft, the Gloster Meteor F.4. In April 1951 these were replaced by the Gloster Meteor F.8, and four years later the squadron received the Hawker Hunter F.5. On 14 July 1957, the squadron was presented with a Standard displaying the unit's Battle Honours by the CAS, Air Marshal Sir Theodore McEvoy KCB CBE, who had served three years with 41 Squadron as a young officer, following his graduation from RAF College, Cranwell in 1925.

However, no amount of nostalgia would save the unit from the Government's budgetary axe. On 15 January 1958, as a part of a scheme to reduce the size of RAF Fighter Command, 41 Squadron fell to the same fate as 600 and 615 Squadrons had before it, and were also disbanded. With the departure of 41 Squadron from RAF Biggin Hill ceased to be a Fighter Command airfield, its infrastructure now deemed out of date for the requirements of modern warfare. The runways had become too short for the RAF's newest generation of aircraft and, as a result of encroaching development and civil air paths which now passed above, the base was no longer in a practical location. Fighter Command officially departed from the airfield on 1 March 1958.

This gave 41 Squadron the curious distinction of being the last fighter squadron ever to be based at Biggin Hill. The departure of the unit marked the end of an era for the Station in every sense of the word, as thereafter it was relegated to non-operational status and only used by the London University Air Squadron.

However, as with 41 Squadron's 1946 disbanding, this, too, was a mere technicality. On 16 January 1958, just a day after being disbanded, 141 Squadron, based at RAF Coltishall, near Norwich in Norfolk, dropped the '1' at the beginning of its number and was thus reborn as 41 Squadron. In doing so, they automatically absorbed 141's all-weather Gloster Javelin FAW.4 fighters and personnel.

41 Squadron's standard, originally presented only six months previously, was handed over to 141 Squadron on 16 January 1958 in a short ceremony attended by Air Officer Commanding-in-Chief, Fighter Command, Air Chief Marshal Sir Thomas Pike, and by 11 Group's Air Officer Commanding, Air Vice-Marshal Victor Bowling, himself a veteran 41 Squadron pilot from 1935.

Only remaining at Coltishall six months, the squadron moved to RAF Wattisham, near Ipswich, Suffolk, on 5 July 1958, where the Gloster Javelin FAW.4s were replaced by FAW.8s in January 1960. By this time, 56 Squadron had also joined them at the station. Whilst there, they hosted French Air Force Dassault Super Mystère fighters during President Charles de Gaulle's state visit in April 1960. 41 Squadron called Wattisham home for approximately five-and-a-half years, before the unit was disbanded again, on 31 December 1963.

On 1 September 1965, after a 20-month break, 41 Squadron was re-formed at RAF West Raynham, near Fakenham in Norfolk, but this time as a completely different structure. The unit remained firmly on the ground as a missile defence squadron, armed with Bloodhound Mk. II surface-to-air-missile (SAM). Changes to the SAM programme, however, saw 41 Squadron disbanded yet again just five years later, on 18 September 1970. The squadron standard was moved to the Church of St. Michael and St. George at RAF West Raynham, for safe-keeping.

On 1 April 1972, at RAF Coningsby in Lincolnshire, the squadron was reborn as a tactical fighter reconnaissance and ground attack unit within 38 Group Air Support Command. To support them in their reconnaissance role, a "Reconnaissance Intelligence Centre" or "RIC" was formed. The RIC is composed of a number of Air Transportable Reconnaissance Exploitation Laboratories which enable the developing of images and their subsequent analysis. The ATRELs can be transported by air or road and can be deployed with the squadron to forward operating bases.

In this role, they were equipped with McDonnell Douglas F-4 Phantom FGR.2s but these were soon deemed to be unsuitable for the unit. Over the ensuing years, a strategic decision was made to change the role of the RAF's Phantoms from a fighter to an interceptor. This amendment, however, created consternation within some circles as it was felt the squadron should maintain its role as a fighter and ground attack unit. Consequently, it was resolved to disband 41 Squadron and re-form it elsewhere to enable it to do so.

In preparation for this change, "41 Designate Squadron" was formed at RAF Coltishall, in Norfolk, on 1 July 1976 and commenced training as a reconnaissance unit with SEPECAT Jaguar GR.1 aircraft. The two squadrons operated independently of one another until 31 March 1977 when 41 Squadron was disbanded at Coningsby. This allowed 41 Designate Squadron to drop 'Designate' from their name, take possession of the standard, adopt the squadron badge, and become the new combat-ready 41 Squadron at RAF Coltishall a day later.

41 Squadron's role changed to low-level reconnaissance and, in early 1978, it became part of SACEUR's Strategic Reserve. In 1980, the unit was assigned to the Allied Command Europe Mobile Force and was subsequently involved in exercises at Bardufoss in Norway and in the Mediterranean.

In support of its reconnaissance role, the unit formed a RIC at Coltishall to process and interpret the photographs made by pilots, using sensors located in a large external pod. The film was taken to the MAREL's (Mobile Aerial Reconnaissance Exploitation Laboratories) for processing and interpretation. Ideally, a mission report would have been generated within 45 minutes of 'engines off'. Smaller "air-portable" RICs were also used during off-base deployments.

As a result of this ability, the squadron has been involved in a number of conflicts over the past two decades. In early 1991, during the First Gulf War (Operation Granby, but more widely known by its American name, "Desert Storm"), a large number of reconnaissance and bombing missions were flown against Iraqi forces with Jaguar GR.1A aircraft as a part of the coalition forces.

In its aftermath, the squadron was deployed to Incirlik, in southwest Turkey, where it participated in the defence of Iraq's Kurdish minority within the boundaries of the country's northern no-fly zone (Operations "Warden" and "Resinate North") until April 1993. It was during this period that the large external photographic pods were replaced with smaller, more versatile, medium level pods.

Four months later, the squadron was deployed to southern Italy, where it flew policing duties over Bosnia in support of Operation Deny Flight until August 1995. It was during this time that one of the unit's Jaguars became the first RAF aircraft to drop a bomb in anger over Europe since the end of World War II. The target was a Bosnian Serb tank.

The squadron returned to Coltishall in August 1995 for a well-earned rest. Despite the vital work they had performed in Iraq and Bosnia, however, the squadron found their photographic systems were inhibited by the use of photographic film, which required special handling and processing before any results could be viewed and analysed. This drawback was compounded by the inherent difficulties of moving hardcopy prints around the battlefield, particularly with the distances involved in modern warfare. To overcome these issues, the Jaguar Replacement Reconnaissance Pod (JRRP) was introduced in August 2000.

The new system provided for the recording of a digital images by three cameras onto VHS-C super videotapes with electro optical sensors for day operations and infra-red sensors for night operations. Digital images were then analysed in the ATRELs through in a windows-based application, named ‘Ground Imagery Exploitation System’, or "GIES". GIES allowed analysts to edit images and send them electronically.

This system was taken into battle on the Squadron's last operational deployment, during the Second Gulf War (Operation Telic) in Iraq in March–April 2003. During the operation, they were based at Incirlik, Turkey, once again, equipped with the more up-to-date Jaguar GR.3.

In July 2004, the Defence Secretary announced that 41 Squadron would be disbanded once again, on 31 March 2006, as a part of a re-organisation of the Defence Forces following a Government spending review, and the so-called Gershon efficiency study. A White Paper, titled "Delivering Security in a Changing World: Future Capabilities", foresaw the retirement of the RAF's Jaguar aircraft two years early and the closure of RAF Coltishall. Advances in technology, it reasoned, would mean air defence could be maintained with fewer aircraft, thus allowing older equipment to be withdrawn from service earlier than originally intended. The authors planned that the RAF's future air combat force would be based around the multi-role Typhoon and Joint Combat Aircraft, in co-operation with the Tornado GR4 and Harrier GR7/GR9. Furthermore, the paper intended to reduce RAF trained strength from 48,500 to 41,000 by 1 April 2008.

As a result of these decisions, every one of RAF Coltishall's units would be directly affected. 16(R) and 54(F) Squadrons, the Operational Evaluation Unit (OEU) and Operational Conversion Unit (OCU) would be disbanded by 1 April 2005, and 41 Squadron by 1 April 2006. 6 Squadron, with the last of the RAF's Jaguars, would be moved to RAF Coningsby on 1 April 2006 and disbanded by 31 October 2007. RAF Coltishall itself would be shut down in December 2006, thus ending an over 66-year history.

The following senior leaders of the RAF all served with 41 Squadron during the Jaguar period: Sir Stephen Dalton, Sir Richard Garwood, Sir Chris Harper, Sir Jock Stirrup, Sir Charles John Thomson, Sir Glenn Torpy.

The first of these draw-downs took place on 11 March 2005, when 16 and 54 Squadrons held a combined passing-out parade. However, their disbandment had little immediate effect on the activity at Coltishall as most airframes and personnel were absorbed into 6 and 41 Squadrons. However, with the departure of these latter squadrons in 2006, and the subsequent closure of the base in December, the close-knit RAF community was dispersed to other locations, and a quiet returned to the area, which has not existed since May 1940.

However, despite the Government's intention to disband 41 Squadron, and plans drawn up for final ceremonies to take place on the first weekend in April 2006, the unit was given a new lease on life only a short while before taking effect. Approval was received to move 41 Squadron to Coningsby with 6 Squadron on 1 April 2006, and to assume the role of the Fast Jet and Weapons Operational Evaluation Unit, or "FJWOEU".

Fast Jet & Weapons Operational Evaluation Unit, 2006–2010
The Fast Jet and Weapons Operational Evaluation Unit (FJWOEU) was formed before it assumed the 41 Squadron number plate. It was created on 1 April 2004 from the merger of the Strike Attack OEU (SAOEU), the F3 OEU and the Air Guided Weapons OEU (AGWOEU). The FJWOEU took over 41(F) Squadron's number plate on 1 April 2006, rescuing 41 Squadron from disbandment that would have otherwise resulted from the retirement of the RAF's Jaguar fleet.

Their new aircraft consisted of Panavia Tornados and Harrier GR9.s, and that same year, the squadron celebrated its 90th anniversary. It remained in the role of FJWOEU until 2010, during that time testing numerous weapons and defence systems that were subsequently deployed by British forces on the front line at various locations throughout the world, including Afghanistan.

Test and Evaluation Squadron, 2010 to present
On 1 April 2010, the Boscombe Down-based Fast Jet Test Squadron (FJTS) was amalgamated into 41(R) Squadron to create a new entity, 41 Squadron Test and Evaluation Squadron, or "41(R) TES", in which form it continues today.

In September 2010, the squadron celebrated the 70th anniversary of the Battle of Britain, holding an event at RAF Coningsby attended by families of pilots of the World War II era. The squadron painted up its aircraft with World War II "EB" codes, recognising various World War II pilots and their aircraft. Originally, some of these codes were applied to the squadron's Harriers, but when these were retired the codes were applied to the Tornados, and subsequently Typhoons, that replaced them. They currently encompass the following World War II aircraft:

Commencing the draw-down of the RAF's Harrier force as a result of the British Government's Strategic Defence and Security review (SDSR), 41 Squadron's three Harrier GR.9’s were transferred to 1 (Fighter) Squadron at RAF Cottesmore on 4 November 2010. The squadron subsequently increased its fleet of Tornado GR.4's to compensate the loss of these aircraft, and only operated the GR.4 until April 2013.

41 Squadron was also in the spotlight on 29 April 2011, when two of its Tornado GR.4s flew with two Typhoons from RAF Coningsby in the RAF flypast down The Mall and over Buckingham Palace for the Royal Wedding of Prince William and Catherine Middleton. One of the Tornados was flown by the squadron's then Officer Commanding, Wg Cdr Rich Davies.

In 2012, to mark the London 2012 Olympic Games, 41 Squadron unveiled special tail markings on Panavia Tornado GR4, ZA614, EB-Z, to commemorate the squadron's link with the Olympic Games. Gp Capt Donald O. Finlay DFC AFC, who commanded the squadron from September 1940 – August 1941, had won Bronze in the Men Hurdles at the 1932 Los Angeles Games, won Silver in the same event at the 1936 Berlin Games, and read the Olympic Oath at the commencement of 1948 London Games.

The first published history of 41 Squadron, "Blood, Sweat, and Valour", was launched at the RAF Club in London in December 2012, and recounts the unit's wartime activity during the war years August 1942 – May 1945. A second volume, entitled "Blood, Sweat and Courage" was launched at the RAF Club in London in December 2014 and covers the preceding war years, September 1939 – July 1942.

Another major change took place on 22 April 2013, when 41 Squadron took over the Eurofighter Typhoon FGR4s of fellow RAF Coningsby based No. 17(R) Test and Evaluation Squadron, which will have a new role, preparing for the introduction of the Lockheed Martin F-35 Lightning II into RAF and Royal Navy service.

41 Squadron's World War II era EB codes have been carried over onto three of their new aircraft. They are ZJ930, coded EB-R for Sqn Ldr Hilary R. L. 'Robin' Hood DFC (OC 41 Sqn 1940); ZJ947 coded EB-L for Wg Cdr Edward 'Shippy' Shipman AFC (1936–40); and ZK332, coded EB-J for Sqn Ldr George H. 'Ben' Bennions DFC (1936–40). An additional aircraft had also joined the Squadron, prompting the need for an eighth code, and the opportunity to honour another of the Squadron's World War II pilots. The honour has gone to Gp Capt Derek S. V. Rake OBE AFC & Bar (1945) and Typhoon ZJ914 has been coded EB-H.

41 Squadron celebrated its centenary in July 2016, by holding a parade and Gala Dinner at RAF Coningsby on 14 July, and a Friends and Families Open Day on 22 July. The 41 Squadron Association was also formed to coincide with the Centenary.

The squadron's Panavia Tornados were phased out in late 2017, and the last flight in this aircraft type took place on Friday, 13 October 2017. 41 Squadron retains its Eurofighter Typhoon FGR4's and will continues to fly these aircraft into the future.

Notable pilots

 Captain Valentine Baker MC AFC served with 41 Squadron from 1916 – June 1917, and served briefly as a Flight Commander. He left the RAF in 1922 to work for Vickers-Armstrong. In 1934, however, he formed the Martin-Baker Aircraft Company with his colleague James Martin, to design new aircraft and offer flying lessons. One of their more notable pupils was Amy Johnson. The company went on to manufacture and market four different propeller aircraft, but Baker himself was killed in a flying accident in 1942, whilst test-flying the third of these. It was his death, however, that caused his business partner to rethink safety and develop a means of assisted escape for pilots. As a result, Martin-Baker began to manufacture ejection seats in 1946, and still does today for both fixed wing and rotary military aircraft. Amongst 80 types of aircraft into which their seats have been fitted are the Jaguar, which 41 Squadron flew from 1977–2006, the Harrier, which the squadron flew from 2006–2010, and the Tornado and Typhoon, both of which they fly today. Martin-Baker ejection seats are now being fitted into the F-35 Joint Strike Fighter. Over 70,000 Martin-Baker ejection seats have been delivered to 93 air forces, which have saved almost 7,500 lives. It is a squadron legacy that in giving his own life, Baker has saved the lives of thousands of others.
 American Lieutenant Eugene Barksdale served with 41 Squadron from July–October 1918, during which time he claimed two victories and was wounded in action. In October 1918, he transferred to the American Expeditionary Force and returned home to become as USAAF test pilot. Clearly a talented pilot in this early era of flight, he is perhaps best known for having flown an Airco DH-4 light bomber from McCook Field in Dayton, Ohio, to Mitchel Field, which became Mitchel AFB in New York, a distance of some 600 miles solely on instruments. However, in August 1926, whilst testing a Douglas O-2 observation aircraft for spin characteristics over McCook Field, he was unable to recover the aircraft and was killed. Buried with full military honours at Arlington National Cemetery, the USAF's Barksdale Air Force Base near Bossier City, Louisiana, was named in his honour when opened in February 1933. The base is currently home to five squadrons of B52 Stratofortresses. Barksdale Street, on Hanscom AFB, Massachusetts, is also named after him.
 Canadian Squadron Leader Frederick R. G. McCall served on 41 Squadron from May to August 1918, in that time claiming 31 victories, which were in addition to a previous four claimed on 13 Sqn. His achievements on 41 were recognised with the award of a DSO and a DFC. Following the war, McCall was employed in civil aviation, and subsequently served at home as a Squadron Leader in the RCAF during World War II. He died in 1949, aged just 53, but by that time had dedicated over 30 years of his life to flying. In recognition of his service to Canadian aviation, a new airfield in Calgary was named McCall Field in his honour. That airfield is today Calgary International Airport.
 Having claimed 60 aerial victories during the First World War, Canadian Air Vice-Marshal Raymond Collishaw is considered the third-highest-scoring Allied pilot of the entire War. By his arrival on 41 Squadron in 1923 as its second peacetime Officer Commanding, he had been awarded no less than 2 DSOs, a military OBE, a DSC, a DFC, 3 MiDs, the French Croix de Guerre, and the three White Russian Orders of St. Stanislas, St. Anne, and St. Vladimir. Along with his significant victory tally, he was very much a legend in his own time. Collishaw retired in October 1943 and spent the rest of the war as a Regional Air Liaison Officer for Civil Defence UK. By the time he returned to his native Canada in 1946, he had also been awarded a CB and a civil OBE.
 Having graduated Sandhurst in 1915, Air Commodore Patrick Huskinson was seconded to the RFC later that same year, and served on 2, 4, and 19 Squadrons before the cessation of hostilities. He was credited with 11 victories, and awarded two Military Crosses. Following the war, he commanded 204 and 70 Squadrons, and then spent four years in instructing roles at Cranwell. For the following 11 years from the mid-1920s, he fulfilled armament and ordinance roles in the United Kingdom and Middle East, with the exception of a 20-month period between February 1930 and October 1931 when he commanded 41 Squadron. Returning to ordinance in March 1938, he became vice president of the Ordnance Committee at Woolwich Arsenal and then the Director of Armament Development with the Ministry of Aircraft Production in 1940, reporting to Lord Beaverbrook. In April 1941, however, Huskinson and his wife were seriously injured by Luftwaffe night-time bombing in the Blitz and Huskinson was blinded. Following nine months’ convalescence, he was retired as an Air Commodore in January 1942. However, he immediately became the president of the Air Armament Board, which post he held until 1945. In this role, he was involved in the development of large bunker-busting bombs, such as the Tall Boy, and in several other technologies, despite his handicap. In 1945, he was appointed a CBE and the U.S. Legion of Merit for his work in this role. Huskinson also wrote an autobiography in 1949 called 'Vision Ahead', which explains his career in some detail. He also recalls his "very happy years in charge of Number 41 Squadron". It was also Huskinson who wrote to the Mayor of St. Omer and obtained permission for 41 Squadron to use part of the Town Arms in its badge.
 Air Commodore Allen H. Wheeler CBE was granted a Short Service Commission in 1924, and served on 41 Squadron as a Flight Commander from September 1933 to August 1936. During this time, he was deployed to Aden with the squadron, arriving there six weeks ahead of the main group and aircraft, as a member of the advance party. From 1940 to 1944, Wheeler's postings related to experimental aircraft and aircraft development, both with the Performance Testing Squadron at Boscombe Down and the Aircraft & Armament Experimental Establishment at Farnborough, for which he was mentioned in dispatches. Between February and October 1944, Wheeler was Station Commander at RAF Fairford where he was involved in glider deployment for D-Day operations and the Arnhem landings. His contribution was recognised with the award of an OBE in the 1945 New Year's Honours. Following further postings, including to Asia and the Mediterranean, Wheeler returned to the Aircraft & Armament Experimental Establishment at Boscombe as it Commandant. He was appointed a CBE whilst there and retired in May 1955. Wheeler was subsequently employed as an aviation consultant and technical advisor to the film industry, and worked on such films as 'The Blue Max' and 'Those Magnificent Men in their Flying Machines', and was even used as a pilot in the latter movie.
 Flight Lieutenant Thomas Weston Peel Long Chaloner, The Honourable Lord Gisborough, 2nd Baron Gisborough of Cleveland, Yorkshire, was a WWI pilot and ex-Prisoner of War who returned to RAF service during World War II. He served as 41 Squadron's Intelligence Officer for over five years of the War, and reported the squadron's activity, victories and losses up the chain of command on a daily basis. He refused further promotion.
 Squadron Leader George Bennions was posted to 41 Squadron in February 1936. It was here that he remained for the ensuing almost five years, and he was commissioned on the Sqn in April 1940. Bennions proved to be quite a talented pilot, and he claimed his first victory over the Channel in July 1940, during the earliest salvoes of the Battle of Britain. Over the months of August and September, Bennions’ tally continued to rise to the point where he had claimed ten and one shared destroyed, seven probably destroyed, and five damaged, making him the second most successful pilot on 41 Squadron during World War II. Aside from his significant victory tally during the Battle of Britain, Bennions is of interest for one of those victories, which took place on 5 September 1940. Contemporary researchers credit him with a shared victory over Oblt Franz von Werra, the Group Adjutant of JG3, who was flying an Me109E. Von Werra's aircraft is believed to have been damaged by Bennions but finished off by 603 Squadron's Plt Off Basil Stapleton, forcing the German pilot to crash-land near Marden, Kent. Von Werra was captured unhurt and sent to Canada, as were the majority of German POWs, to hinder their chances of escape. However, von Werra nonetheless succeeded in escaping, and returned to Germany in April 1941. So unusual was this feat that he was the only German POW to succeed in doing so during the War. Von Werra's story was the subject of a book, and also of a film entitled 'The One That Got Away', which was released in 1957 and starred Hardy Krüger as von Werra.

 Pilot Officer Eric Lock joined the RAF Volunteer Reserve in February 1939 and was posted to 41 Squadron as his first operational unit, in mid-June 1940. Lock's first operational sortie took place on 9 August 1940, which was uneventful, as was his second a few days later. However, between 15 August and 17 November 1940, Lock claimed no less than 22 aircraft destroyed, and he became the most successful RAF pilot of the Battle of Britain and the equal second highest-scoring pilot in the RAF at the time. Over the three consecutive months of September, October and November 1940, Lock was awarded a DFC, a Bar, and a DSO. On the afternoon of 5 September 1940, 41 Squadron's most intensive day of the Battle of Britain, Lock claimed three victories in a single sortie. The aircraft he flew that day, Spitfire Ia, N3162, EB-G, is recognised by 41 Squadron, which has the letters EB-G on one of their Typhoons, and by the BBMF, which has EB-G emblazoned on their Spitfire P7350. Lock was seriously wounded in action on 17 November 1940, and underwent multiple operations, which included three skin grafts at the hands of Dr. Archibald McIndoe at East Grinstead. Following seven months’ recuperation, he returned to operations with 611 Squadron in late June 1941. During July 1941, he added another three victories to his already impressive list, but on 3 August, he failed to return from a routine operation after attacking a German column on a road behind Boulogne. In recognition of his achievements and status in Battle of Britain history, he is remembered on several memorials and in his hometown of Bayston Hill, outside Shrewsbury, where a street is named after him. He remains today one of the RAF's top ten Aces of World War II, credited with some 25 aircraft destroyed and 7 probably destroyed, all bar three of which he achieved on 41 Squadron.
 Group Captain Donald O. Finlay: pre-war Olympian and Officer Commanding 41 Squadron, September 1940 – August 1941. 41 Squadron honoured Finlay during the 2012 London Olympics by painting up the tail of one of the unit's Tornados. Although that aircraft was recently retired, the squadron continues to honour Finlay with one of the Tornados marked up as EB-Z.
 South African Pilot Officer J. J. ‘Chris’ Le Roux flew with 41 Squadron for a short period in late 1940-early 1941. In July 1944, by now OC, 602 Squadron, Le Roux was credited with attacking and seriously injuring General Erwin Rommel in his staff car, on a road outside Sainte Foy de Montgomerie, in Normandy. Strafing the vehicle, the driver lost control, struck a tree and spun off the road. Rommel fractured his skull when he was thrown from the vehicle. In doing so, Le Roux single-handedly removed Germany's commanding general from the Normandy battlefield.
 Dutch Flight Lieutenant Bram van der Stok was posted to 41 Squadron as a Fg Off in December 1941. Promoted to Actg Flt Lt and appointed OC A Flight in March 1942, he quickly claimed two victories, but was shot down over France the following month. Taken into immediate captivity, he was sent to Stalag Luft III, Sagan, where he remained until March 1944 when he took part in the mass escape of airmen that we know today as The Great Escape. All but three of the escapees were recaptured and fifty of them were executed as retribution on Hitler's orders. Of the three that successfully made their escapes, van der Stok was one. Acting as a Dutch labourer on forged papers, he made it back the United Kingdom in early July 1944, travelling on a route, which took him through the Netherlands, Belgium, France, Spain and Gibraltar. In 1963, United Artists released the film, 'The Great Escape', based upon a book of the same name, written by Australian author Paul Brickhill in 1950. In the movie, a character broadly based on van der Stok was played by James Coburn.
 Canadian Sergeant Pilot George F. Beurling was posted to 41 Squadron in April 1942, but proved too head-strong, fought with other members of the unit, and gained a reputation for doing his own thing in the air and not remaining in formation or following orders. By the following month, he was requesting a transfer to Malta and it was granted. Nonetheless, in his brief time with 41 Squadron, he claimed his first two victories. In time, he became Canada's leading World War II ace, and was credited with 31 victories between May 1942 and December 1943. As a result, he was awarded a DSO, a DFC and two DFMs. However, he was 'retired' early from the RCAF in 1944 as his skill in cockpit was matched by streak of rebelliousness, and disrespect for authority. He had a reputation for ignoring team tactics and breaking formation to attack the enemy alone and had gained two nicknames, 'Buzz Beurling' and the not-so-complimentary 'Screwball Beurling'.<ref>"George Frederick "Screwball" Beurling."  acesofww2.com'. Retrieved: 3 August 2009.</ref>
 Prince Emanuel Vladimirovitch Galitzine was the great-great grandson of Catherine the Great. He fled Russia with his parents and siblings in the wake of the October Revolution in 1917, and settled in England, where he was educated. Galitzine joined the RAF Volunteer Reserve on a Short Service Commission in late 1938, but left again to go to Finland in early 1940 to fight the Soviets attempting to occupy the country. Returning to London again in October 1940, after his mother was killed in the Blitz, Galitzine rejoined the RAFVR, but had to do so as an aircraftsman, though he was recommissioned in September 1941. Galitzine saw operational service in several squadrons before joining 41 Squadron as a Fg Off in May 1943, and he claimed a probably destroyed enemy aircraft with the unit in October. Following his tenure with the squadron, he was rested as personal assistant to Air Vice-Marshal Sir William Dickson, then commanding 83 Group, which was preparing for the Normandy invasion. When Dickson was posted to Italy, Galitzine accompanied him, adding Italian to an already impressive list of languages he spoke. Following the War, Galitzine worked in the civil aviation industry, but maintained links with Russia and, in 1998, attended the reburial and funeral service of the murdered Tsar and his family in St Petersburg.
 Flying Officer Peter Gibbs was a generally unassuming character who served with 41 Squadron between January 1944 and March 1945. He was an active pilot during his tour and an avid musician. He became a professional musician after he left the RAF in August 1945 and joined the Philharmonia Orchestra in 1954. Within two years, he had joined the London Symphony Orchestra and during this time became (in)famous for a dressing down he gave to one of the Century's most celebrated performing artists, Herbert von Karajan. The orchestra felt von Karajan had been unprofessional when conducting smaller, ‘less important’ concerts during a tour of the United States in 1956. He had often just bowed once and left the stage at the end of concerts, refusing to return for encores, despite the applause from the audience. The orchestra was slighted by this behaviour, and eventually had had enough. The last straw came when von Karajan left the stage in Boston after the last note was played, neither waiting for applause nor calls for an encore. The orchestra, in which Gibbs was playing first violin, was upset by this apparent insult to both them and the audience, but turned up nonetheless on time for an early rehearsal the following morning. Von Karajan, however, came in late, much to the disgruntlement of the orchestra. When he finally arrived, Peter Gibbs, an impromptu, self-appointed spokesman, stood up and addressed him directly, demanding an apology. He rebuked von Karajan, stating, "I did not spend four years of my life fighting bastards like you to be insulted before our own allies as you did last evening." Von Karajan ignored him completely and continued conducting as if nothing had happened. That night, however, during a concert, von Karajan chose his moment and, during the interval, refused to go back on stage until a letter was signed stating that Gibbs be immediately sacked. The orchestra's managers had little choice but to bow to the demand. Although Gibbs was never to play with the Philharmonia again after this incident, it is understood that von Karajan also never conducted the Philharmonia again after the tour either, and it is said that he vowed to never conduct an English orchestra again. All this time, Gibbs also flew privately. He had joined the Surrey Flying Club in June 1957 and then flew more-or-less continuously for the next 18 years. Gibbs bought himself a Tiger Moth and enjoyed peacetime flying. However, flying was also what brought about his premature death in December 1975. He took off for a brief flight in a Cessna from Glenforsa Airfield on the Isle of Mull in Scotland on Christmas Eve 1975, but failed to return. A search was mounted but no trace whatsoever could be found of him. Oddly, his body was found four months after his disappearance part way up a hill, approximately one mile from Glenforsa Airfield, without his aircraft, showing the signs of having lain there all that time. The original search for Gibbs had passed through the area at the time he had gone missing, but nothing had been seen. His body gave away no clues as to his cause of death. Gibbs’ missing Cessna bewildered officials and his case soon became known as the ‘Great Mull Air Mystery’. It was not until September 1986 – almost 11 years after Gibbs’ death – that his aircraft was located in the sea off Oban. The aircraft's remains also gave up no clue as to the reason it was there. It can only be assumed that Gibbs, for some reason, came down in the sea and that he had managed to free himself and swim ashore. It is thought he then tried to make his way back to the airfield, around a mile away, but, considering the time of year, location, and likely temperatures of both the water and air, probably succumbed to the effects of exposure.

 Palestinian Sergeant Pilot Aharon Remez was posted to his first and only operational unit, 41 Squadron, in April 1945 and served with the unit until March 1946, and was not commissioned in the RAF. Based in Germany during the last weeks of the war and beyond, he witnessed Nazi atrocities first hand, and often lent a personal hand. The officers of 41 Squadron turned a blind eye, and he was given special leave to allow him to be able to do so. This enabled him to commence assisted passage for many holocaust survivors to the Middle East. Remez left the RAF in 1946 and returned home to champion the formation of a Jewish State. This occurred in May 1948, and in July he was given the post of Brigadier General and the founder and first Commanding Officer of the Israeli Air Force. He held this post until December 1950. Remez was subsequently the Head of Purchasing Delegation, Israeli MOD mission to the United States, the Israeli Defence Minister's Aide for Aviation, a member of the House Committee & Foreign Affairs & Defense Committees of the 3rd Knesset, Director of the Dept for International Co-operation in the Foreign Affairs Ministry, Director General of the Israeli Ports Authority, and Chairman of the Israeli Aviation Authority. Remez was also the Israeli Ambassador to the United Kingdom from May 1965 to July 1970 and often met up with his former 41 Squadron colleagues from 1945 whilst based there.
 Squadron Leader Terry Spencer was originally commissioned with the Royal Engineers in December 1939, he transferred to the RAFVR as a Plt Off in October 1941. Following training, he was posted to 26 Squadron at Gatwick in November 1942 and remained with this unit until February 1944, in that time being promoted to Flt Lt and he left the unit as a Flight Commander. Following a brief posting to 165 Squadron, Spencer was posted to 41 Squadron as OC A Flt at the beginning of May 1944. Arriving just prior to D-Day, he led the Squadron on a number of operations in advance support of the invasion, and then led the unit on anti-Diver operations from June 1944, when the V1 Doodlebug menace commenced. Within four months, he had become a V1 Ace, with seven shot down, and also claimed a destroyed German fighter, thereby ending the career of a 171-victory Luftwaffe Ace Emil 'Bully' Lang. Spencer was posted to 350 Squadron within the same Wing to take command on 4 January 1945. On 26 February, however, he was hit by Flak over Germany and captured. A month later, he escaped from camp by bicycle, and subsequently motorcycle, with another former 41 Sqn pilot, Sqn Ldr Keith 'Jimmy' Thiele, in a Steve-McQueen-style getaway, in which the pair made it back to Allied lines. Spencer returned to 350 Squadron, where he once again took over command on 2 April 1945. Only 17 days later, he was shot down once again, this time over Wismar Bay, in northern Germany. Blown out of his cockpit, the force deployed his parachute at a height of just 30–40 feet, which he miraculously survived, only to be captured again. The successful jump has since been credited by the Guinness Book of Records as having been the lowest authenticated survived bale-out on record. Spencer was injured and hospitalised, but liberated by advancing Allied armies approximately two weeks later. He was awarded an immediate DFC for his exploits. In 1947, he was also awarded the Territorial Efficiency Medal and the Belgian Croix de Guerre with Palm. Spencer was demobbed in December 1945 and headed to South Africa in spring 1946, taking three weeks to fly himself there in a single-engined Percival Proctor. He was employed there as the personal pilot of Ben du Preez, Managing Director of Kimlite Industries, which was a cover for illicit diamond buying. Spencer then returned to the United Kingdom where he met the actress Lesley Brook, who starred in at least 24 films between 1937 and 1948. They married in August 1947 and resided for a time on the Isle of Wight, before returning to South Africa in July 1948. On this occasion, he launched a new career by founding the aerial photography company in October that same year. The company enjoyed some success, but he was to become a more successful freelance photographer for LIFE Magazine, for whom he worked between September 1952 and September 1972. During his time with LIFE, he covered several conflicts, including Biafra, Congo, and the Vietnam War, and spent three months on tour with a then little-known band called The Beatles. When LIFE folded in 1972, Spencer moved to People magazine, where he spent the ensuing 20 years. He authored and published two books, the first a renowned coffee table book about The Beatles ('It was Thirty Years Ago Today'), and the second an autobiography ('Living Dangerously'), which he co-authored with his wife. Following his death in February 2009, The Times published a glowing obituary of a man who was a real-life adventurer, and whose life and exploits were the very stuff of ‘Boys Own’ magazines.

Statistics

Key dates 1916–2016

Bases 1916–2016

Aircraft operated 1916–2016

Officers Commanding 1916–2021

Decorations awarded 1916–1946

Prisoners of War 1916–1918 & 1939–1945

Escapers and evaders 1939–1945

Guinea Pig Club members

Roll of Honour 1916–2016

References

Notes

Bibliography

 Brew, Steve, Blood, Sweat and Valour. London: Fonthill Media, 2012. .
 Brew, Steve, Blood, Sweat and Courage. London: Fonthill Media, 2014. .
 Halley, James J. The Squadrons of the Royal Air Force & Commonwealth 1918–1988. Tonbridge, Kent, UK: Air Britain (Historians) Ltd., 1988. .
 Jefford, C.G. RAF Squadrons: A Comprehensive Record of the Movement and Equipment of all RAF Squadrons and their Antecedents Since 1912. Shrewsbury, Shropshire, UK: Airlife Publishing, 2001. .
 Rawlings, John. Fighter Squadrons of the RAF and their Aircraft''. London: Macdonald and Jane's Publishers Ltd., 1969 (second edition 1976). .

External links

 RAF Website – 41 Squadron
 Wattisham Squadrons – 41 Squadron
 41 (F) Squadron RAF at War and Peace, April 1916 – March 1946
 Blood, Sweat and Courage, 41 Squadron RAF Sep 1939 – Jul 1942
 Blood, Sweat and Valour, 41 Squadron RAF Aug 1942 – May 1945
 41 Squadron – The End of an Era
 RAF Web 41 Squadron History
 Wartime History of 41 Sqn RAF
 Wartime History of 41 Sqn RFC
 No 41 Squadron Association

Military units and formations established in 1916
041 Squadron
041 Squadron
Military units and formations of the Gulf War
1916 establishments in the United Kingdom